Bibi Hakimeh Rural District is a rural district (dehestan) in the Central District of Gachsaran County, Kohgiluyeh and Boyer-Ahmad Province, Iran. At the 2006 census, its population was 1,789, in 400 families. The rural district has 7 villages. Many battles have been fought here. People died.

References 

Rural Districts of Kohgiluyeh and Boyer-Ahmad Province
Gachsaran County